Escombreras is an islet at the mouth of Cartagena's port, in Spain's Region of Murcia. Since 2011 a breakwater built for the expansion of Cartagena's port hooks around the north side of the island, but does not connect to it.

The steep islet covers 4 hectares. An anchorage and lighthouse (built in 1864 at 65 metres above sea level) are present, but there is no permanent human habitation.

Archeological remains from the Greek and Roman periods have been found on the islet.

The islet is included within a natural park.

References

Islands of Spain
Uninhabited islands of Spain
Landforms of the Region of Murcia